Star Ferry Pier may refer to the following piers in Hong Kong:

 Star Ferry Pier, Central, a ferry pier in Central, Hong Kong Island
 Star Ferry Pier, Tsim Sha Tsui, a ferry pier in Tsim Sha Tsui, Kowloon